Jubilate Deo omnis terra (LWV 77/16) is a motet by Jean-Baptiste Lully (music) set on biblical text. Written to both celebrate the new treaty and to celebrate the wedding of King Louis XIV and Maria Theresa of Spain on 29 August 1660 at the l'église de la Mercy.

History 
Lully´s first grand motet was composed primarily for the Louis XIV´s wedding and as well as the celebration of Treaty of the Pyrenees (1659).
Text is based on twelve psalms.

Text

See also 
 List of compositions by Jean-Baptiste Lully

References  

Compositions by Jean-Baptiste Lully
Motets